Kidnap is a 1974 Italian poliziottesco film. It stars actor Gabriele Ferzetti.

Cast
 Henry Silva: Commissario Caprile
 Rada Rassimov: Marta
 Philippe Leroy: il professore
 Gabriele Ferzetti: Frank Salvatore
 Franco Diogene: Nino
 Lia Tanzi: Marisa
 Calisto Calisti: mafioso
 Pino Ferrara: Mercuri
 Armando Brancia: avvocato
 Loris Bazzocchi: mafioso
 Paul Muller: Jimmy
 Fausta Avelli: Luisa Barsanti
 Luciano Bartoli: Pino
 Renato Pinciroli
 Rosita Torosh

References

External links

1974 films
1970s Italian-language films
Poliziotteschi films
1974 crime films
Films scored by Piero Piccioni
Films directed by Giovanni Fago
1970s Italian films